Jean-Marie Pirot (December 26, 1926 – August 23, 2018), popularly known as Arcabas (a name given to him by his pupils), was a French contemporary sacred artist.

Pirot was born in Trémery. He studied in the École Nationale Supérieure des Beaux-Arts of Paris and taught in the École des Beaux-Arts of Grenoble. He became known for his works in Saint-Hugues-de-Chartreuse church. 
From 1969 to 1972, he was appointed guest artist by the Canadian government, and was a professor of the University of Ottawa, where he created "l’atelier collectif expérimental".

Later, back in France, he founded the atelier "Éloge de la Main". He received several demands from the French government and religious institutions. His works can be found in France, Germany, Mexico, Canada and the USA. He last lived in Saint-Pierre-de-Chartreuse, in Isère.

He used several techniques: sculpture, engraving, tapestry, mosaic or cabinet work, but specially painting. He also worked for theater making scenery and costumes.

His works were usually inspired by stories of the Bible.

External links
 Site officiel de l'artiste
 Musée départemental d'art sacré contemporain : pour un aperçu de l'église Saint-Hugues de Chartreuse.

1926 births
2018 deaths
20th-century French painters
21st-century French painters
French male painters
People from Moselle (department)